Andreas Kronthaler (born 11 March 1952) is an Austrian former sport shooter who competed in the 1984 Summer Olympics.

References

1952 births
Living people
Austrian male sport shooters
ISSF rifle shooters
Olympic shooters of Austria
Shooters at the 1984 Summer Olympics
Olympic silver medalists for Austria
Olympic medalists in shooting
Medalists at the 1984 Summer Olympics
20th-century Austrian people